Rajesh Bindal (born 16 April 1961) is a Judge of Supreme Court of India. He is the former Chief Justice of Allahabad High Court. He has also earlier served as the acting Chief Justice of Jammu and Kashmir High Court and Calcutta High Court.

Career 
Rajesh Bindal was appointed a judge of the Punjab and Haryana High Court in 2006. On 11 November, he was recommended for a transfer to the Jammu and Kashmir High Court, the common high court for the union territories of Ladakh and Jammu and Kashmir.

On 9 December 2020, Bindal was appointed by the President of India to serve as the acting chief justice of the Jammu and Kashmir High Court following the retirement of Gita Mittal. On 5 January 2021, following the elevation of Justice Pankaj Mithal as the Chief Justice of the Jammu and Kashmir High Court, Justice Bindal was transferred as a Judge to the Calcutta High Court. Following the retirement of T. B. Radhakrishnan, he was appointed by the president to serve as the acting Chief Justice of the Calcutta High Court on 29 April. 

He was elevated as Chief Justice of Allahabad High Court on 9 October 2021 and took oath on 11 October 2021.

Notable judgements

Promotion reservations 
Bindal was on the two judge bench along with justice B.S. Walia which quashed the Punjab Scheduled Caste and Backward Classes (Reservation in Services) Act, 2006. The legislation granted 20% reservations in promotions for Scheduled Castes and Scheduled Tribes in C and D category government services and 14% in A and B category government services.

References 

 Indian judges
1961 births
Living people
Judges of the Punjab and Haryana High Court
Judges of the Jammu and Kashmir High Court
Judges of the Calcutta High Court
Chief Justices of the Allahabad High Court